Miss Universe 1994, the 43rd Miss Universe pageant, was held on May 21, 1994 at the Plenary Hall of the Philippine International Convention Center in Pasay, Philippines. 77 contestants competed during this year.

Outgoing titleholder Dayanara Torres of Puerto Rico crowned Sushmita Sen of India at the end of the event, marking the first time India has won Miss Universe, which they would later win again in 2000 and in 2021.

Background

Location and date 
Manila was announced as host city for the pageant in October 1993. It was the second time the pageant was held in the Philippines, after it was staged in Manila in 1974. It was staged at the Philippine International Convention Center in Manila, at approximately 8:00 in the morning (Philippine local time), to allow CBS in the United States to televise the pageant live in prime time.

Results

Final Competition

Special Awards

Order of Announcements

Top 10

Top 6

Top 3

Judges

Selection committee
Final Telecast judges:
 Carlos Arturo Zapata - Colombian fashion designer
 Florence LaRue - American Singer 
 Richard Dalton - Princess Diana's stylist and confidante
 Beulah Quo - Chinese-American actress 
 Emilio T. Yap - Publisher and Business tycoon 
 Stephanie Beacham - English actress 
 Jonas McCord - Chinese-Filipino business tycoon and philanthropist
 Mona Grudt - Miss Universe 1990 from Norway

List of contestants
77 Contestants Competed for the Title.

Contestants Notes

Debuts
  - attended for the first time, after separating from Soviet Union. Inna Zobova was the winner of Miss Russia in 1993, which was the national pageant.
  attended for the first time, after separating from Czechoslovakia. Silvia Lakatošova was the winner of Miss Czech and Slovak Republic in 1993, which was the national pageant together with the Czech Republic.

Returns
Last competed in 1992:
 
 
  — Joanne Wu was allowed to wear Republic of China sash while she was off-staged. There were two sashes for her, one was written (Taiwan) R.O.C., and the other was written Republic of China as stated above.

Replacements
  - Eleonora Carrillo, Miss El Salvador 1994 couldn't take part due she was underage before February 1.Eleonora Carrillo, la Miss El Salvador que imparte justicia en España Her 1st Runner up, Claudia Méndez replaced it for the event, although Carrillo competed the following year at the Miss Universe 1995 finishing in the Top 10.

Withdrawals

   — Bianca Engel
 
  — the country's national pageant was held together with Slovakia for a special occasion after the dissolution of Czechoslovakia.
 
   — Lara Badawi
   — Karen Celebertti
 
   — Jessalyn Pearsall

Did not compete
  — Loreta Brusokaitė - withdrew due to unknown reasons, made a debut in Miss Universe 2012

Observations
  - Venna Melinda was not allowed to compete in the pageant because of her country's conservative Islamic prejudice towards the swimsuit competition, though she eventually traveled to Manila to watch the pageant instead.

Areas of competition
The delegates started arriving in Manila by mid-April and were involved in nearly four weeks of events and competitions. They also visited different locations and attractions throughout the Philippines.

Prior to the final telecast, all contestants competed in pre-pageant shows including the national costume and opening show held at the Araneta Coliseum, and swimsuit and evening gown during the preliminary competition held at its main venue, the Philippine International Convention Center. They also participated in interviews with the judges.

During the final competition, the top 10 contestants (based on their preliminary scores) competed in the swimsuit, evening gown and interview. The top six contestants participated in a final round of on-stage interviews, and cut to the final top three before the runners-up were announced and the new Miss Universe named.

Notable controversies
 The country expected to make 10 million PHP (US$357,000) profit out of the pageant, as well as the accompanying media exposure. The 150 million pesos ($5.3 million) spent on hosting the pageant was funded from the private sectors, with sponsors such as Nestlé, Kodak and Hertz. Some of the expected sponsorship money did not materialize, leading the shortfall to be covered by the government. By mid May, as the contestants were already in Manila, organizers confirmed that they were short of money and were unsure whether a profit would be made from the event.
 In the midst of power shortages around the time of the pageant, the Philippine government promised to ensure that the weekend of the pageant's coronation night would be "blackout-free".
 The pageant came under public attack from the Nationalist Movement of New Women, a branch of the National Democratic Front, which claimed that it was being used to promote sex tourism. The cost of the event was also criticised by the Philippine Congress, despite it being endorsed by President Fidel Ramos. A social function attended by the delegates held prior to the final broadcast was picketed by the women's group, who opposed the nature of the pageant and the lavish spending.
 During rehearsal on the day prior to the pageant, a small homemade bomb exploded outside the pageant venue where the contestants had earlier been rehearsing, though it caused minimal damage and there were no injuries were taken. As a result, more than 3000 Filipino police officers were involved in protecting the delegates, as well as dozens of policewomen assigned as personal or group bodyguards.
 During May there was also a probe by the Commission on Human Rights as to whether a police round-up of street children was intended to improve Manila's international image during the pageant events. This was also criticised by Miss Thailand, Areeya Sirisopha Chumsai, even though the same incident occurred in Thailand in the Miss Universe 1992 pageant.
 Miss Russia Inna Zobova  was detained for 15 hours in a windowless room at an airport in Bangkok, Thailand en route to Manila due to a lack of transit visa.
 Miss Malaysia, Liza Koh, made a public apology on behalf of her country about the arrest of 1200 Filipina domestic helpers in Kuala Lumpur.  As a result, the Malaysian Foreign Minister Abdullah Ahmad Badawi admonished her not to make any further political remarks.
 Miss Mauritius Viveka Babajee became a controversial figure due to her involvement in the 1994 Metro Manila Film Festival scandal where she was a presenter for the Best Actress award together with actress Gretchen Barretto, an award which was highly disputed among the Philippine media.
 Miss Philippines Charlene Gonzales, gained criticism for winning the Best National Costume award, as the judges were also criticized for allegedly favouring the host nation's delegate. Miss British Virgin Islands, Delia Jon Baptiste, publicly declared that Gonzales won the award, because of Filipino favouritism, and that the other delegates disagreed with the choice. Miss Venezuela Minorka Mercado, won the Philippine costume Terno award, followed by Slovakia, who was also celebrating her birthday, and Miss Mexico by their respective placements.

Notes

References

General references

External links
 Miss Universe official website

1994
1994 in the Philippines
1994 beauty pageants
Beauty pageants in the Philippines
Events in Metro Manila
Pasay
May 1994 events in Asia
ABS-CBN television specials